Kate Sedley (born 30 July 1926) is the pen-name of Brenda Margaret Lilian Clarke (née Honeyman), an English historical novelist. She was born in Bristol in 1926 and educated at The Red Maids' School, Westbury-on-Trym. She is married and has a son and a daughter, and three grandchildren. Her medieval historical whodunnits feature Roger the Chapman, who has given up a monk's cell for the freedom of peddling his wares on the road.

Roger the Chapman series
Set in 15th-century Great Britain:
 
Death and the Chapman (1991)
The Plymouth Cloak (1992)
The Hanged Man aka The Weaver's Tale (1993)
The Holy Innocents (1994)
The Eve of Saint Hyacinth (1995)
The Wicked Winter (1995)
The Brothers of Glastonbury (1997)
The Weaver's Inheritance (1998)
The Saint John's Fern (1999)
The Goldsmith's Daughter (2001)
The Lammas Feast (2002)
Nine Men Dancing (2003)
The Midsummer Rose (2004)
The Burgundian's Tale (2005)
Prodigal Son (2006)
The Three Kings of Cologne (2007)
The Green Man (2008)
The Dance of Death (2009)
The Wheel of Fate (2010)
The Midsummer Crown (2011)
The Tintern Treasure (2012)
The Christmas Wassail (2013)

As Brenda Honeyman
 The Kingmaker (1969)
 Richmond and Elizabeth (1970)
 Harry the King (1971) aka The Warrior King as Brenda Clarke
 Brother Bedford (1972)
 Good Duke Humphrey (1973)
 The King's Minions (1974)
 The Queen and Mortimer (1974)
 Edward the Warrior (1975)
 All the King's Sons (1976)
 The Golden Griffin (1976)
 At the King's Court (1977)
 The King's Tale (1977)
 Macbeth, King of Scots (1977)
 Emma, the Queen (1978)
 Harold of the English (1979)

As Brenda Clarke
 Glass Island (1978)
 The Lofty Banners (1979)
 Far Morning (1982)
 All Through the Day (1983)
 A Rose in May (1984)
 Three Women (1985)
 Winter Landscape (1986)
 Under Heaven (1988)
 Equal Chance (1989)
 Sisters and Lovers (1990)
 Beyond the World (1991)
 Riches of the Heart (1991)
 A Durable Fire (1993)
 Sweet Auburn (1995)
 Richard Plantagenet (1997)
 Last of the Barons (1998)
 The Warrior King (1998) aka Harry the King as Brenda Honeyman
 A Royal Alliance (1998)

Novels
 For King and Country (2006)

References

External links
Sedley short biography at Fantastic Fiction
Sedley at Macmillan

1926 births
Living people
20th-century English novelists
21st-century English novelists
English historical novelists
Writers of historical fiction set in the Middle Ages
Writers of historical mysteries
People educated at The Red Maids' School